The open water swimming portion of the 2011 World Aquatics Championships was held between July 19–23 in Shanghai, China at the Jinshan City Beach.

Events 

The following events were contested by both men and women in Shanghai:

5 km
10 km
25 km

In addition, there was a team competition with male and female competitors.

Schedule

Medal table

Medal summary

Men

Women

Team

References

 
2011 World Aquatics Championships
Open water swimming at the World Aquatics Championships
2011 in swimming
Swimming in Shanghai